Iflaviridae is a family of positive sense RNA viruses insect-infecting viruses. Some of the insects commonly infected by iflaviruses include aphids, leafhoppers, flies, bees, ants, silkworms and wasps. The name "Ifla" is derived from the  name "Infectious flacherie virus", a member species. There is one genus (Iflavirus) and 16 species in this family.

Structure

Members of this family are insect-infecting viruses that consist of positive single-strand RNA genomes translated into a single polyprotein of ~3000 amino acids long. It encodes helicase, protease and RNA-dependent RNA polymerase enzymes and four structural proteins (VP1–4). The non-enveloped capsid has an icosahedral T=pseudo3 symmetry and is around 30 nm in diameter. VP1, VP2 and VP3 form the outer portion, with VP4 located internally. Genomes are linear and non-segmented, around 8.8-9.7kb in length.

Life cycle
Viral replication is cytoplasmic. Entry into the host cell is achieved by attachment to host receptors, which mediates endocytosis. Replication follows the positive stranded RNA virus replication model. Positive stranded RNA virus transcription is the method of transcription. Translation takes place by ribosomal skipping. Insects serve as the natural host.

Pathogenicity
Several viruses in this family are economically important because they are highly pathogenic to their honeybee and silkworm hosts, while others (including Dinocampus coccinellae paralysis virus, Nasonia vitripennis virus and Venturia canescens picorna-like virus) appear to cause little or no symptoms.

Taxonomy 
The family Iflaviridae contains one genus, Iflavirus, with the following 16 species:

Acheta domesticus iflavirus
Antheraea pernyi iflavirus
Brevicoryne brassicae virus
Deformed wing virus
Dinocampus coccinellae paralysis virus
Ectropis obliqua virus
Infectious flacherie virus
Lygus lineolaris virus 1
Lymantria dispar iflavirus 1
Nilaparvata lugens honeydew virus 1
Perina nuda virus
Sacbrood virus
Slow bee paralysis virus
Spodoptera exigua iflavirus 1
Spodoptera exigua iflavirus 2
Varroa destructor virus-1

References

External links
 ICTV Online (10th) Report; Iflaviridae
 ICTV Online (10th) Report; Iflaviridae, alternative link 
 Viralzone: Iflavirus

 
Picornavirales
Virus families